Family policy in Spain refers to the implementation of public policy measures that aim to support the social actions carried out by families, as well as define family roles and relationships within Spain. These laws and services provide Spanish families with provisions regarding parental leave, childcare, family allowances, marriage, divorce, and cohabitation.

History

Franco era

Spain is categorized within the Southern European social model, due largely in part to its strong dependence on family assistance and support. Rather than promoting state reliance, the predominance of the male breadwinner model and the family-oriented nature of social measures in Spain has hindered the development of effective family policies, according to the South European Society and Politics journal. In Francoist Spain from 1939 until 1975, strong state intervention established social protections for families; however, these programs provided fragmented coverage for male industrial workers and their families exclusively. Those working in the agriculture sector as well as women, who were highly unemployed, received little to no benefits in regards to family protections. Family policy during this time mainly served to encourage large families, especially through the promotion of measures such as the 1943, Large Family Law which rewarded families with the largest number of children.

Restoration to democracy

After Spain became a democracy and established its Constitution in 1978, family policy profoundly changed to reflect a new emphasis on promoting work-life balance. This led to the elimination of payments for marriage and for those given after the birth of each child. For employed individuals, the main benefit was payments transferred monthly for those with dependent children, as well as various extensions of maternity leave and childcare provisions. These policies gave women the chance to possess a more participatory role within Spain's overall workforce, rather than remaining solely in the domestic sphere. Bringing together family and employment obligations through family policy, however, still took a number of years to fully develop. The legacy of Francoist Spain, in which married women were strongly encouraged to stay home, continued to hamper women's efforts in gaining employment and receiving state-paid family assistance.

Current situation

Recent efforts to improve family protections have largely been undermined by the presence of fragmented coverage and drastic budget cuts. The current economic crisis that began in 2007, has led the Spanish government to implement various austerity measures which have directly hindered the development of Spanish family policies. These measures were meant to curtail the ill effects of the economic downturn, however, they also worked to instigate a resurgence of the belief that family life is a private, rather than a public, matter. Alongside this, the lack of sufficient family protections have also had effects on Spain's overall fertility rate. Since the latter half of the 1970s, the fertility rate has experienced a steady decline, going from a rate of 2.78 to a low of 1.323 in the mid 2000s. The average age of the Spanish at their first birth has also been rising, having increased by 6 years from the 1980s to the mid 2000s. These trends are due in part to Spain's underdeveloped family policies, which have incentivized new parents to return to work at a quicker pace, and have also required families to manage the expensive costs of child-rearing on their own.

References

Spain
Policy
Politics of Spain